Kelsey Card (born August 20, 1992) is an American track and field athlete whose specialty is the discus throw.

Career

Kelsey Card finished a Master's degree in 2019 and opened Marriage and family therapy business in Madison, Wisconsin.

During the 2016 season, Card won the individual title at the Big Ten Conference outdoor track and field championships and took first place for All-American honors at NCAA national championships in discus.

Kelsey Card placed third in Discus behind Team USA teammates Whitney Ashley and Shelbi Vaughan at 2016 United States Olympic Trials (track and field) to qualify to represent  at Athletics at the 2016 Summer Olympics.

She represented the United States at the 2020 Summer Olympics.

International competitions

USA National Championships

NCAA and Big Ten Championships representing Wisconsin
Kelsey earned 11 USTFCCCA NCAA Division I All-American awards and Big Ten Conference honors 14-times.

References

External links

1992 births
Living people
Track and field athletes from Illinois
People from Macoupin County, Illinois
American female discus throwers
American female shot putters
Wisconsin Badgers women's track and field athletes
Athletes (track and field) at the 2015 Pan American Games
Athletes (track and field) at the 2019 Pan American Games
Pan American Games track and field athletes for the United States
Athletes (track and field) at the 2016 Summer Olympics
Olympic track and field athletes of the United States
Athletes (track and field) at the 2020 Summer Olympics